is a Japanese volleyball player who plays for Okayama Seagulls. She also plays for the All-Japan women's volleyball team.

Career 
Miyashita was once a wing-spiker, but was converted to setter by Akiyoshi Kawamoto, who was on the senior staff of Osaka International Ōwada Junior High and the head coach of the Okayama Seagulls.

In September 2009, while still attending Ōwada Junior High, Miyashita registered with the Okayama Seagulls. On 28 November 2009 Miyashita debuted in a V.Premier League match at the age of 15 years and two months. That is the record for the youngest debut in the V.Premier League. In the match Miyashita collided with a teammate, and broke two front teeth.

In September 2010 Miyashita was nominated for the All-Japan women's volleyball team, and made her national team debut at the 2010 Asian Women's Cup Volleyball Championship held in Taicang.

In August 2013 Miyashita competed in the 2013 FIVB World Grand Prix as a member of senior national team and in 2016 she played at the 2016 Summer Olympics in Rio de Janeiro.

Clubs 
 Osaka International Ōwada Junior High
  Okayama Seagulls (2009-)

Awards

Individual 
 2010 Kurowashiki All Japan Volleyball Tournament - New face Award
 2014 2013-14 V.Premier League - Excellent Player Award, Best 6
 2016 World Olympic qualification tournament "Best Setter"

Team 
 2012-13 V.Premier League -  Bronze Medal with Okayama Seagulls
 2013 Empress's Cup -  Runner-up with Okayama Seagulls
 2013-14 V.Premier League -  Runner-up with Okayama Seagulls

National Team 
 2013 Asian Championship -  Silver medal
 2014 FIVB World Grand Prix -  Silver medal

References

External links 
 FIVB official profile
 V.League official profile
 Okayama Seagulls official profile

1994 births
Living people
People from Mie Prefecture
Japanese women's volleyball players
Okayama Seagulls players
Japan women's international volleyball players
Olympic volleyball players of Japan
Volleyball players at the 2016 Summer Olympics